Amos & Andrew is a 1993 American buddy action-comedy film directed and written by E. Max Frye and starring Nicolas Cage and Samuel L. Jackson. The film's title parodies that of the sitcom Amos 'n' Andy while the premise also appears to be a riff on The Defiant Ones. Shot in and around Wilmington, North Carolina in 1992, the film concerns wealthy African-American playwright Andrew Sterling's (Jackson) purchase of a summer home on a predominantly white island. It was released to box office failure, grossing just under $10 million domestically, and receiving generally negative reviews from critics.

Plot

When Andrew Sterling, a successful black urbanite writer, buys a vacation home on a resort island in Massachusetts, two of his new neighbors, the Gillmans, mistake him for a burglar as he sets up his new stereo. The neighbors have no idea that the former residents of that home had moved and soon call the police.

As the police move in, Andrew's car alarm goes off and with keys in hand, he goes outside to shut it off; where he is met with gunfire. The reporters arrive and interview Chief Tolliver, who speaks to Andrew over the phone and realizes his mistake. To avoid the bad publicity, the Chief offers a thief in his jail, Amos Odell a deal.

The Chief orders Amos to break into Andrew's home, hold the writer hostage, and give himself up, in exchange for free passage out of town. Armed with the shotgun given to him by the Chief, Amos enters the house under the Chief's direction and ties up Andrew. Andrew believes Amos is an assassin sent to kill him due to his published views against "white America".

As the press piles up outside of Andrew's home, the Chief calls Amos to release Andrew as soon as the press is in place, promising to leave Amos' name and face out of the news. While Amos waits, he turns on the news to see he has been betrayed, with his name and face all over the television. With his deal broken, Amos steps outside and demands a ransom for the famous author.

The Chief comes in the back door demanding Amos's surrender and reveals his lack of concern with Andrew's well-being, stating his opposition to Andrew living on the island. During a scuffle, Andrew hits the Chief unconscious with his frying pan and goes for the shotgun. Amos takes the gun back and tells Andrew he will remain his hostage.

With the Chief's handcuffs, Amos cuffs himself to Andrew and runs through the backwoods behind the home and hole themselves up in the Gillmans' home. The Gillmans return home and Amos takes them hostage as well. The Chief, now free from captivity, once again demands Amos surrender, believing he is still somewhere in Andrew's home. When the Chief tells Amos he is not concerned with Andrew's safety and intends to prosecute him for assaulting him with the frying pan, Amos reveals his two new hostages, and repeats his ransom demand.

Awaiting the ransom, Amos and Andrew watch the Gillmans' news interview, explaining how the incident started because they had seen a black man inside of the house and assumed he was up to no good. A pizza Amos ordered arrives at the Gillman home, and Amos gives the pizza girl the Gillmans' and the Chief's interview tape to give back to the press. Back in the Gillmans' home, Amos finds the key to the Gillmans' car and invites Andrew to join him as his partner in crime, which disgusts Andrew.

Andrew's home is set on fire during a scuffle between the police and the crowd. The pizza girl returns the interview tape to the reporters. The Chief sends out a man with his two bloodhounds to find Andrew, and Amos, as he is chased through a field, rescues Andrew and the two watch as Andrew's home burns in the distance.

Still upset at the Chief, Andrew uses the Chief's wallet, which Amos had taken from him and sics the bloodhounds on the Chief using the new scent. In the middle of the news interview, the reporters reveal they know the truth about the incident. As the Chief realizes he no longer possesses the tape of his interview, the two bloodhounds chase him from the scene.

Amos and Andrew are shown having boarded a barge, now on the other side of the island, where Amos and Andrew meet up with Andrew's wife. Amos drives away as Andrew and his wife hug, and the two part ways as friends. The last scene shows Amos at a stop sign, apparently headed toward Canada, who then turns onto Interstate 95, unknowingly going in the wrong direction.

Cast
 Nicolas Cage as Amos Odell
 Samuel L. Jackson as Andrew Sterling
 Dabney Coleman as Police Chief Cecil Tolliver
 Brad Dourif as Officer Donnie Donaldson
 Michael Lerner as Phil Gillman
 Margaret Colin as Judy Gillman
 Giancarlo Esposito as Reverend Fenton Brunch
 Tracey Walter as Bob "Bloodhound Bob"
 Ron Taylor as Sherman
 Neal Richardson as Press Pool Reporter #1
 Mike Caulder as Press Pool Reporter #2

Reception
Roger Ebert gave the film two out of four stars, writing that Amos & Andrew "is not bad so much as misguided" due to its comedic treatment of issues such as racism, racial injustice and police brutality, suggesting that "the movie needs to be either more innocent about race in America, or less. It portrays an unpleasant situation and then treats it with sitcom tactics. Either the humor should have been angrier and more hard-edged, or the filmmakers should have backed away from the situation altogether." Vincent Canby also felt the film was like a sitcom, writing that "[the film's] roots are not in life but in other, better movies and sitcoms."

In 2016, Nathan Rabin wrote, "for two surprisingly solid acts at least, Amos & Andrew is a sometimes scathing, sometimes funny exploration of the intersection of class and race and the way racism works in our society that feels like it could have been ripped from today’s headlines" but that "the film’s deflating third act largely eschews satire and social commentary for the much cheaper, more audience-friendly terrain of the plot-driven mismatched buddy comedy. That’s a shame, because in its early going, Amos and Andrew is unusually incisive in its depiction of the intersection of class and race, especially for a studio comedy."

References

External links 
 
 
 

1990s American films
1990s black comedy films
1990s buddy comedy films
1990s crime comedy films
1990s English-language films
1993 comedy films
1993 directorial debut films
1993 films
American black comedy films
American buddy comedy films
American crime comedy films
Castle Rock Entertainment films
Columbia Pictures films
Fictional duos
Films about writers
Films about racism
Films produced by Gary Goetzman
Films scored by Richard Gibbs
Films set in Massachusetts
Films set on islands
Films shot in North Carolina
New Line Cinema films